The 2018 Arkansas Razorbacks women's soccer team represented the University of Arkansas during the 2018 NCAA Division I women's soccer season. This season was the 33rd in program history. The Razorbacks played their home games at Razorback Field in Fayetteville.

Previous season

In 2017, the Razorbacks finished the regular season 9–9–1, 4–5–1 in SEC play, and were seeded eighth in the SEC Tournament, where they defeated top-ranked South Carolina en route to the championship game, where they fell to Texas A&M. The Razorbacks were selected as an at-large bid to the NCAA Tournament, where they fell to NC State in the first round of the North Carolina bracket. The Hogs finished their season with a record of 11–11–2.

Personnel

Roster

Coaching Staff

Schedule
Source:

|-
!colspan=8 style=""| Spring exhibition

|-
!colspan=8 style=""| Fall exhibition

|-
!colspan=8 style=""| Regular season

|-
!colspan=8 style=""| SEC Tournament

|-
!colspan=8 style=""| SEC Tournament

Postseason game summaries

SEC Quarterfinal – vs. Ole Miss

SEC Semifinal – vs. Florida

SEC Final – vs. LSU

References

Arkansas
Arkansas Razorbacks soccer, women's
Arkansas
Arkansas Razorbacks women's soccer seasons